Stellar, or Stellar Lumens, is an open source, decentralized protocol for digital currency to fiat money low-cost transfers which allows cross-border transactions between any pair of currencies. The Stellar protocol is supported by a Delaware nonprofit corporation, the Stellar Development Foundation, though this organization does not enjoy 501(c)(3) tax-exempt status with the IRS.

History 
In 2014, Jed McCaleb, founder of Mt. Gox and co-founder of Ripple, launched the network system Stellar with former lawyer Joyce Kim. Before the official launch, McCaleb formed a website called "Secret Bitcoin Project" seeking alpha testers. The nonprofit Stellar Development Foundation was created in collaboration with Stripe CEO Patrick Collison and the project officially launched that July. Stellar received $3 million in seed funding from Stripe. Stellar was released as a decentralized payment network and protocol with a native currency, stellar. At its launch, the network had 100 billion stellars. 25 percent of those would be given to other non-profits working toward financial inclusion. Stripe received 2 percent or 2 billion of the initial stellar in return for its seed investment. The cryptocurrency, originally known as stellar, was later called Lumens or XLM. In August 2014, Mercado Bitcoin, the first Brazilian bitcoin exchange, announced it would be using the Stellar network. By January 2015, Stellar had approximately 3 million registered user accounts on its platform and its market cap was almost $15 million.

The Stellar Development Foundation released an upgraded protocol with a new consensus algorithm in April 2015 which went live in November 2015. The new algorithm used SCP, a cryptocurrency protocol created by Stanford professor David Mazières.

Lightyear.io, a for-profit entity of Stellar, launched in May 2017 as the commercial arm of the company. In September 2017, Stellar announced a benefits program, part of its Stellar Partnership Grant Program, which would award partners up to $2 million worth of Lumens for project development. In September 2018, Lightyear Corporation acquired Chain, Inc and the combined company was named Interstellar.

In 2021, Franklin Templeton launched the first “tokenised” US mutual fund using Stellar.

Usage  
In 2015, it was announced that Stellar was releasing an integration into Vumi, the open-sourced messaging platform of the Praekelt Foundation in South Africa. Vumi uses cellphone talk time as currency using the Stellar protocol. Stellar partnered with cloud-based banking software company Oradian in April 2015 to integrate Stellar into Oradian's banking platform to add microfinance institutions (MFIs) in Nigeria.

Deloitte announced its integration with Stellar in 2016 to build a cross-border payments application, Deloitte Digital Bank.  In December 2016, it was announced that Stellar's payment network had expanded to include Coins.ph, a mobile payments startup in the Philippines, ICICI Bank in India, African mobile payments firm Flutterwave, and French remittances company Tempo Money Transfer.

In October 2017, Stellar partnered with IBM and KlickEx to facilitate cross-border transactions in the South Pacific region. The cross-border payment system developed by IBM includes partnerships with banks in the area. The Lumens digital currency was ranked 13th in market capitalization at the time of the IBM partnership.

In December 2017, TechCrunch announced Stellar's partnership with SureRemit, a Nigerian-based non-cash remittances platform.

On January 6, 2021, the Ministry of Digital Transformation of Ukraine announced cooperation and partnership with Stellar in development of Ukraine digital infrastructure, after which Stellar value increased by 40%.

Ecosystem 
Stellar has an active community ecosystem and supports projects that utilize the Stellar Network with the Stellar Community Fund.

Overview 

Stellar is an open-source protocol for exchanging money or tokens using the Stellar Consensus Protocol. The platform's source code is hosted on GitHub.

Servers run a software implementation of the protocol, and use the Internet to connect to and communicate with other Stellar servers. Each server stores a ledger of all the accounts in the network. 3 nodes are operated by the Stellar Development Foundation, in conjunction with 21 other organizations, providing for a total of 66 validator nodes.  Transactions among accounts occur not through mining but rather through a consensus process among accounts in a quorum slice.  The current network fee is 100 stroops, equivalent to 0.00001 XLM.

See also
 Blockchain-based remittances companies

References

External links
Official Website

Internet protocols
Payment systems
Cryptocurrency projects
Blockchains